Proctoporus sucullucu is a species of lizard in the family Gymnophthalmidae. It is endemic to Peru.

References

Proctoporus
Reptiles of Peru
Endemic fauna of Peru
Reptiles described in 2003
Taxa named by Tiffany M. Doan
Taxa named by Todd Adam Castoe